Odd Vattekar (2 January 1918 in Kyrkjebø – 19 February 1992) was a Norwegian politician for the Conservative Party.

He was elected to the Norwegian Parliament from Vestfold in 1969, and was re-elected on two occasions.

On the local level he was a member of the executive committee of Holmestrand municipality council from 1955 to 1962 and 1967 to 1971. His political career ended with the position of County Governor of Vestfold, which he held from 1979 to 1988.

Outside politics he spent his entire professional career at the company Nordisk Aluminiumindustri, serving the last three years as director.

He fought in the Spanish Civil War, and in World War II as a member of the Norwegian resistance movement.

References

1918 births
1992 deaths
Norwegian people of the Spanish Civil War
International Brigades personnel
Norwegian resistance members
Members of the Storting
Conservative Party (Norway) politicians
Vestfold politicians
County governors of Norway
20th-century Norwegian politicians